Valentina Semyonovna Ivashova (1915–1991) was a Soviet film actress. She was sometimes credited as Vera Ivashova.

Selected filmography
 The Nightingale (1936)
 Young Pushkin (1937)
 Alexander Nevsky (1938)
 Rainbow (1944)
 Sorochinskaya Yarmarka (1948)

Family

Valentina Ivashova was married to Soviet film director Nikolai Ekk.

References

Bibliography
 Georges Sadoul & Peter Morris. Dictionary of Films. University of California Press, 1972.

External links

1915 births
1991 deaths
Soviet film actresses
Ukrainian film actresses
Gerasimov Institute of Cinematography alumni